"Divinity" is a song by American record producer Porter Robinson featuring Amy Millan. It is the opening track for Robinson's debut studio album, Worlds, released on August 12, 2014.

Background and composition 
"Divinity" was one of the first songs written for Worlds, and Robinson chose it as the opening track of the album due to its sound, which he believed to be "very [him]" and representative of the album. In an interview with Cuepoint, Robinson clarified: "I started the album with that song because it was the first one that I wrote that I felt was in the style of Worlds. It was the first one that had the 90 BPM, side-chained chords, sort of slowed-down but still four-on-the-floor and more emotional quality that starts the hook, which I’d say it was a big part of the sonic quality of Worlds. That was the first song that I wrote like that. And I also love albums that start off with like a strong riff."

A distorted sound, a "boys choir type sound that [he] was messing with", works as the main instrument of the track. The instrumental existed before Amy Millan was featured on the track. Millan is the vocalist of Stars, a band that connects to Robinson's emotional adolescent years. On August 5, 2014, NPR pre-released the song.

Reception and legacy 
Alberto Reyes of EDMTunes said that "Divinity" "works perfectly as the first track on the debut, a lovely tune that serves as a great thesis statement for Worlds". Similarly, Scott Greene of Your EDM stated that the song "serves as a great introduction to the overall concept of the album". Derek Staples of Consequence of Sound declared that the "ethereal electro vibes" of "Divinity" "evoke images of a Glitch Mob/The M Machine collaboration". According to Barry Walters of Spin, the song "features many EDM trademarks — a walloping beat, a wall of synths, a breathy female cameo [...] all reduced to a nearly funeral plod".

In 2015, the song was remixed by Odesza and included in Worlds Remixed. Billboard critics chose the song as the 6th best of Porter Robinson, in 2017. In 2018, it was remixed by Rezz. Robinson played the song in 2021 at Secret Sky.

Charts

References 

2014 songs
Porter Robinson songs
Song recordings produced by Porter Robinson
Songs written by Porter Robinson